NameBase is a web-based cross-indexed database of names that focuses on individuals involved in the international intelligence community, U.S. foreign policy, crime, and business. The focus is on the post-World War II era and on left of center, conspiracy theory, and espionage activities up to 2008.

Overview
Founder Daniel Brandt began collecting clippings and citations pertaining to influential people and intelligence agents in the 1960s and especially in the 1970s after becoming a member of Students for a Democratic Society, an organization that opposed US foreign policy. With the advent of personal computing, he developed a database which allowed subscribers to access the names of US intelligence agents.

In the 1980s, through his company Micro Associates, he sold subscriptions to this computerized database under its original name, Public Information Research, Inc (PIR).  At PIR's onset, Brandt was President of the newly formed non-profit corporation, and investigative researcher Peggy Adler served as its Vice President.  The material was described as "information on all sorts of spooks, military officials, political operators and other cloak-and-dagger types". He told The New York Times at the time that "many of these sources are fairly obscure so it's a very effective way to retrieve information on U.S. intelligence that no one else indexes." One research librarian calls it "a unique part of the 'Deep Web'", equally useful to investigative journalists and students.

By 1992, private citizens, news organizations, and universities were all using NameBase. With the advent of public access to the Internet and World Wide Web in the 1990s these efforts became the basis of the NameBase website starting in 1995. , the database contained "over 100,000 names with over 260,000 citations drawn from books and serials with a few documents obtained under the Freedom of Information Act." The website utilizes hyperlinks to allow users to both visualize relationships in a social network diagram and access diagrams and links of those who appear on it. These linkages, diagrams, and hyperlinked footnoted information allow users to uncover potential relationships or connections between individuals and groups. NameBase was described by  information scientist Paul B. Kantor as being the "only web-based tool readily available for visualizing social networks of terrorism researchers."

Similar projects
In the 1980s Daniel Brandt taught former CIA employee Philip Agee how to use computers and computer databases for his research. Former CIA analyst Ralph McGehee developed a similar database he called CIABASE, a website containing information on events, people, and programs concerning the CIA or American intelligence, including links to other texts available to the public.

The Notable Names Database (NNDB) is an online database and self-described "intelligence aggregator" bringing together the biographical details of over 40,000 people.

See also
 Social network
 Deep web

References

External links
 
 NameBase Source List

Internet properties established in 1995
Online databases